Emma Sharp (1832–1920) was an athlete famous for her feat of pedestrianism completing a 1000-mile walk in 1000 hours, the event first completed by Robert Barclay Allardice in 1809. She is thought to be the first woman to complete the challenge, finishing on 29 October 1864, having started on 17 September that same year. This 'arduous task' was reported in the newspapers of the day, in which she was described as having a medium build but an active frame, dressed in male clothing with the exception of her straw hat which was adorned with 'feminine ornaments'.

She rested in the Quarry Gap pub, in Bradford, UK, in between walking approximately two mile stints every 90 minutes and completing 14,600 laps of 120 yards over the course of 1000 hours. It is reported that her food was drugged and people attempted to trip her to prevent her from finishing, for the last two days she carried a pistol to protect herself. At the end of the walk the weather was extremely wet. The event was heavily wagered upon both in Leeds and provincial towns.

Sharp is reported to have used the proceeds of the walk, which exceeded £500, to set up a rug making business in Perseverance works in Laisterdyke, and to have had a life in business after the event.

Her journey was covered by Horrible Histories and broadcast on children's BBC (CBBC).

Family 
She was married to mechanic John Sharp. Her granddaughter Ann Land retained her walking stick as a memento. Her great great granddaughter Kathy Nicol was interviewed on the subject of the 1000 mile walk in 2009. A distant relative, Val Moran, planned to match the achievement around Lennox Gardens, Adelaide Australia in 2009.

References 

19th-century sportswomen
Sportspeople from Bradford
British female racewalkers
1832 births
1920 deaths